The 2015 Slovenian Football Cup was the final match of the 2014–15 Slovenian Football Cup to decide the winner of the 24th edition of the Slovenian Football Cup, Slovenia's top knockout tournament. The match was played at Bonifika Stadium in Koper on 20 May 2015 and was won by Koper, who defeated Celje with the score 2–0. This was the third cup title for Koper.

Background
The final was played between Koper and Celje, both competing in the Slovenian PrvaLiga. This was the second time that Koper and Celje met in the cup final, having faced each other in the final during the 2005–06 cup edition, where Koper won their first cup title after the penalty shootout. Celje previously competed in seven finals, but managed to win only once, when they defeated Gorica in the 2004–05 cup edition.

Road to the final

Note: In all results below, the score of the finalist is given first.

Match details

See also
2014–15 Slovenian Cup
2014–15 Slovenian PrvaLiga
2015 Slovenian Supercup

References

Cup
Slovenian Football Cup finals
Slovenian Football Cup Final 2015
Slovenian Football Cup Final 2015